"Angeline" is a song recorded by Canadian country music artist Sean Hogan. It was released in 2000 as the fifth single from his second studio album, Hijacked. It peaked at number 8 on the RPM Country Tracks chart in September 2000.

Chart performance

References

1999 songs
2000 singles
Sean Hogan songs